The R719 is a Regional Route in South Africa.

Route
Its north-eastern terminus is the R30, 25 km south of Bothaville and 35 km north of Odendaalsrus. It heads south-west to the town of Wesselsbron. At Wesselsbron, it meets the south-eastern terminus of the R505 and crosses the R34. It continues south-west, ending at the R710 at Bultfontein.

References 

Regional Routes in the Free State (province)